Sciota divisella is a species of snout moth. It was described by Philogène Auguste Joseph Duponchel in 1842 and is found in Spain, France, Italy, Croatia, Bosnia and Herzegovina, Greece, Bulgaria, Ukraine and Iran.

References

Phycitini
Moths described in 1842
Moths of Europe
Moths of Asia